Samuel Damon may refer to:

 Samuel C. Damon (Samuel Chenery Damon, 1815–1885), missionary to Hawaii 
 S. Foster Damon (Samuel Foster Damon, 1893–1971), American academic, critic and poet
 Samuel Mills Damon (1841–1924), businessman in Hawaii